

The ANBO II was a parasol-wing monoplane aircraft built in Lithuania in 1927 as a pilot trainer for the Army. It was the first Lithuanian trainer aircraft of own design. It was eventually reequipped with more powerful engine for the Aero Club of Lithuania in 1931 before being written off after a crash in 1934.

The plane was not produced in series, yet it served as a prototype for latter trainers Anbo-III and Anbo-V/51, developed by Antanas Gustaitis.

Replica 
A full size flying replica was restored in 2012-2016 by Rolandas Kalinauskas and Arvydas Šabrinskas. Due to difficulties in obtaining original Walter engine, a Russian-made Shvetsov M-11 engine, having similar parameters, was used. Test flight of the restored Anbo II took place on 18 October 2016. The plane is based in Pociūnai airfield, Lithuania and is mostly used for air shows with both constructors dressing in Lithuanian Air Force uniforms of 1920s-1930s.

On August 8, 2021 after an engine failed during a climb at the altitude of 20-30 meters the aircraft crashed at Cesis Airfield, near Priekuļi, Latvia. The plane stalled resulting in a fatal crash for both the pilot Arvydas Šabrinskas, and the aircraft.

Operators

Lithuanian Air Force
Aero Club of Lithuania

Specifications

References

Bibliography 
 Ramoška, Gytis, Pirmasis lietuviškas mokomasis lėktuvas Anbo-II, Plieno sparnai, Nr. 5, 2008
 
 Lithuanian Aviation Museum

Parasol-wing aircraft
Single-engined tractor aircraft
1920s Lithuanian military trainer aircraft
2
Aircraft first flown in 1927